Alaverdi Monastery is a Georgian Eastern Orthodox monastery located  from Akhmeta, in the Kakheti region of Eastern Georgia. While parts of the monastery date back to 6th century, the present day cathedral was built in the 11th century by Kvirike III of Kakheti, replacing an older church of St. George. It is considered one of the four Great Cathedrals of the Georgian Orthodox world.

History
The monastery was founded by the Assyrian monk Joseph (Yoseb, Amba) Alaverdeli, who came from Antioch and settled in Alaverdi, then a small village and former pagan religious center dedicated to the Moon. However its overall size is smaller than the cathedral of Svetitskhoveli in Mtskheta. The monastery is the focus of the annual religious celebration Alaverdoba. Situated in the heart of the world's oldest wine region, the monks also make their own wine, known as Alaverdi Monastery Cellar. The cellar has been dated to between the 10th and 12th centuries.

Burials 
 Ketevan of Kakheti
 Teimuraz I of Kakheti

See also 

 Telavi
 Gurjaani
 Tsinandali

References

Georgian Orthodox monasteries
World Heritage Tentative List